Morwell railway station is located on the Gippsland line in Victoria, Australia. It serves the town of Morwell, and it opened on 1 June 1877.

A disused track exists opposite the single platform, which was used in the past when State Electricity Commission and rail freight trains were more common.

Two branch lines exist at the Down end of the station; the Maryvale paper mill branch, and the Energex briquette branch. The former is regularly used for paper trains each weekday, while the latter is not in use. The Energex briquette branch originally opened to traffic in 1951.

The station was electrified on 15 March 1956, and had regular electric locomotive services until 2 July 1987. The overhead wires were later removed.

In 1966, a signal panel was provided at the station, when Automatic and Track Control was provided between Morwell and Moe. The panel was abolished on 28 April 2006.

The station was also the terminus of the Mirboo North branch line. The last passenger service operated on 7 September 1968, with passenger services ceasing two days later, on 9 September. The last freight service operated on 18 June 1974, with the line closing six days later, on 24 June.

In 1988, a number of points at the station were abolished, as well as a siding leading to the former dock platform.

The station was upgraded during the early 1990s.

Much of the old yard located adjacent to the station was removed in 2004, as part of works associated with the Regional Fast Rail project. Latrobe City Council's offices now reside in the former location of the yard.

As part of the Regional Rail Revival project, a second platform will be constructed at the station, and will include upgraded accessibility improvements. The crossing loop, located in the Up direction of the station, will also be extended as part of the project.

Platforms and services

Morwell has one platform. It is serviced by V/Line Traralgon and Bairnsdale line services.

Platform 1:
 services to Traralgon, Bairnsdale and Southern Cross

Transport links

Latrobe Valley Bus Lines operates five routes via Morwell station, under contract to Public Transport Victoria:
: Moe – Traralgon
: Morwell – Churchill
: Traralgon – Moe station
: to Mid Valley Shopping Centre
: to Mid Valley Shopping Centre

South Coast Bus operates one route via Morwell station, under contract to Public Transport Victoria:
Wonthaggi – Traralgon station

Warragul Bus Lines operates two routes via Morwell station, under contract to Public Transport Victoria:
Garfield station – Traralgon Plaza
Traralgon station – Drouin North

References

External links
Victorian Railway Stations Gallery
Melway map

Railway stations in Australia opened in 1877
Regional railway stations in Victoria (Australia)
Morwell, Victoria
Transport in Gippsland (region)
City of Latrobe